Albrecht Bertram (* October 2, 1950, in Braunschweig) is a former university professor of mechanics. He held the Chair of Strength of Materials of the Institute of Mechanics (IFME) at the Otto von Guericke University Magdeburg and is an associate professor at the Department of Continuum Mechanics and Material Theory of the Institute of Mechanics at the Technical University of Berlin.

Life and career 
During his career he had several guest stays at the following universities:
 Universidad Industrial de Santander, Bucaramanga, Columbia, 1983 to 1985 (lecturer)
 University of Dar es Salaam, Tansania, 1986 (guest lecturer)
 Pontifical Catholic University of Rio de Janeiro, Brasilia, 1987 (research stay)
 Ecole des Mines in Paris, Frankreich, 2005 (guest professor)
 University of Havana, Cuba, 2010 guest professor)
 University of California at Berkeley, USA, 2010 (guest scientist)

Research focus 
Bertram's work focuses on material modelling. The background is the continuum thermomechanically consistent development of extended approaches for engineering applications. The work covers the entire range of inelastic material behaviour with geometric non-linearity.

In addition, he deals with the basics of generalized continuum theories, especially the continua where higher gradients of the displacements are used.

Miscellaneous 
Bertram is considered as a representative of the so-called 'Berlin School of Continuum Mechanics'. This school is strongly influenced by works of the scientists Clifford Truesdell and Walter Noll. He is known for his precise representations based on mathematical and physical principles while avoiding purely intuitive approaches.

Selected writings 
 Axiomatische Einführung in die Kontinuumsmechanik, BI Wissenschaftsverlag, 1989, http://d-nb.info/891051260
 Micro-Macro-Interactions in Structured Media and Particle Systems, Springer, 2008 (as editor together with Jürgen Tomas), 
 Elasticity and Plasticity of Large Deformations: An Introduction, Springer, 2012 (third edition), 
 Festkörpermechanik, self-publishing, 2015 (second edition), http://edoc2.bibliothek.uni-halle.de/hs/id/26047 (together with Rainer Glüge)
 Solid Mechanics: Theory, Modeling, and Problems, Springer, 2015,  (together with Rainer Glüge)
 Compendium on Gradient Materials, Eigenverlag, 2019 (third edition), https://doi.org/10.13140/RG.2.2.36769.51045
 Magdeburger Vorlesungen zur Technischen Mechanik, self-publishing, 2016,  http://www.redaktion.tu-berlin.de/fileadmin/fg49/publikationen/bertram/Bertram_Magdeburger_Vorlesungen_2016.pdf
 Formelsammlung zur Technischen Mechanik, self-publishing, 2016,  http://www.ifm.tu-berlin.de/fileadmin/fg49/publikationen/bertram/Bertram_Formelsammlung_Techn_Mechanik_2016.pdf

References

External links 
 Official Homepage at Technical University Berlin
 Literature by and about Albrecht Bertram in the catalogue of German National Library
 Picture of Albrecht Bertram on the websites of the mechatronics students at Otto von Guericke University Magdeburg
  Albrecht Bertram in Mathematics Genealogy Project

1950 births
Living people
Scientists from Braunschweig
Academic staff of Otto von Guericke University Magdeburg
Academic staff of the Technical University of Berlin